The Cave is a novel by Portuguese author José Saramago who received the Nobel Prize in 1998. It was published in Portuguese in 2000 and in English in 2002.

Plot
The story concerns an elderly potter named Cipriano Algor, his daughter Marta, and his son-in-law Marçal. One day, the Center, literally the center of commerce in the story, cancels its order for Cipriano's pottery, leaving the elderly potter's future in doubt. He and Marta decide to try their hand at making clay figurines and astonishingly the Center places an order for hundreds. But just as quickly, the order is cancelled and Cipriano, his daughter, and his son-in-law have no choice but to move to the Center where Marçal works as a security guard. Before long, the mysterious sound of digging can be heard beneath the Center, and what the family discovers will change their lives forever.

See also
Allegory of the Cave
Plato

External links
 Reviews
Amantea, Carlos. The Cave. accessed 2009-01-15
Austin, Page. Yale Review of Books - Shadows on the Wall. accessed 2009-01-15
Keates, Jonathan. New York Times - Shadows on the Wall. Published Nov. 24, 2002. accessed 2009-01-15
The Quarterly Conversation. accessed 2009-01-15
The Independent published 11th Feb 2003

Novels by José Saramago
2000 novels
20th-century Portuguese novels
Metafictional novels
Postmodern novels